Oleiros is a municipality in the district of Castelo Branco in Portugal. The population in 2011 was 5,721, in an area of 471.09 km2. The present mayor is José Santos Marques, elected by the Social Democratic Party. The municipal holiday is the Monday after the 2nd Sunday of August.

Economy

Built in 2006, a wind farm (Pinhal Interior Wind Farm) operates in Oleiros, comprising a 54 MW power generation capacity.

Population

Oleiros has a total population of 5,271 in 2011.

Parishes
Administratively, the municipality is divided into 10 civil parishes (freguesias):

 Álvaro
 Amieira - Oleiros
 Cambas
 Estreito - Vilar Barroco
 Isna
 Madeirã
 Mosteiro
 Orvalho
 Sarnadas de São Simão
 Sobral

Notable people 
 Father António de Andrade (1580 – 1634) a Jesuit priest and explorer; a missionary in India, 1600–1634; the first known European to cross the Himalayas and reach Tibet.

References

External links
 Vestas receives another order for V90-3.0 MW wind turbines in Portugal

 
Municipalities of Castelo Branco District